The Communauté de communes du Pays de Saint-Éloy is a communauté de communes, an intercommunal structure, in the Puy-de-Dôme department, in the Auvergne-Rhône-Alpes region, central France. It was created in January 2017 by the merger of the former communautés de communes Cœur de Combrailles, Saint-Éloy Communauté and Pionsat, joined by 5 other communes. Its area is 683.5 km2, and its population was 15,841 in 2018. Its seat is in Saint-Éloy-les-Mines.

Composition
The communauté de communes consists of the following 34 communes:

Ars-les-Favets
Ayat-sur-Sioule
Biollet
Bussières
Buxières-sous-Montaigut
La Cellette
Charensat
Château-sur-Cher
La Crouzille
Durmignat
Espinasse
Gouttières
Lapeyrouse
Menat
Montaigut
Moureuille
Neuf-Église
Pionsat
Le Quartier
Roche-d'Agoux
Sainte-Christine
Saint-Éloy-les-Mines
Saint-Gervais-d'Auvergne
Saint-Hilaire
Saint-Julien-la-Geneste
Saint-Maigner
Saint-Maurice-près-Pionsat
Saint-Priest-des-Champs
Sauret-Besserve
Servant
Teilhet
Vergheas
Virlet
Youx

References

Saint-Eloy
Saint-Eloy